Curt Ernst von Morgen (1 November 1858 in Neiße – 15 February 1928 in Lübeck) was a Prussian explorer and officer, later General of Infantry during World War I. He was a recipient of Pour le Mérite with Oak Leaves.

Explorer in Cameroon  

Curt von Morgen was stationed in German Kamerun and undertook two research journeys to central Cameroon in 1889 and from 1890 to 1891. After the expeditions, Morgen returned to Germany but in 1894 he was tasked with the formation of the Kamerun Schutztruppe. He also led two military expeditions against the Abo north of Douala and the Kwe (Bakwiri) near Mount Cameroon.

The Middle East 
In 1896-97, he followed as military observer the English Dongola-Expedition against the  Mahdists. In 1897, he became Military Attaché in Istanbul. He followed as observer the Greco-Turkish War (1897) and prepared the visit of Kaiser William II to Palestine in 1898.

Military service in Germany
On 27 January 1912, he was promoted to Generalmajor and assigned as commander of the 81st Infantry Brigade  in Lübeck. On 9 August 1913, when the emperor visited the town, he reported to him.

World War I
On mobilisation for World War I in August 1914, he became commander of the 3rd Reserve Division from Danzig, and promoted to Generalleutnant on the 19th of that month.  He commanded this division as part of the 8th Army in the pivotal Battle of Tannenberg at the opening of the war on the Eastern Front, and at the subsequent First Battle of the Masurian Lakes.  For his performance in this period, he was awarded the Pour le Mérite on 1 December 1914.

On 24 November 1914, he took over command of I Reserve Corps from Otto von Below.  He led this Corps for almost the entire war, only swapping places with Richard Wellman in command of XIV Reserve Corps in August 1918.

With the I Reserve Corps, he fought in the Battle of Łódź (1914) and in the Romanian campaign (1916-1917) in which he failed to achieve a decisive breakthrough after being defeated by the Romanians at Dragoslavele, 8 miles from the town of Câmpulung. Von Morgen argued that much more of the Romanian Army could have been captured if a breakthrough would have been achieved at Câmpulung. He insisted that this would have achieved "a real victory, a Cannae, a Tannenberg".

He was awarded the Oakleaves to the Pour le Mérite (signifying a second award) on 11 December 1916.

Later life
After his retirement he became General of Infanterie and returned to Lübeck.

Family
His son Heinrich-Joachim von Morgen (1902–1932) was an early German race car driver. His daughter Elizabeth married in 1923 the aircraft designer Anthony Fokker (1890-1939).

Awards
 Iron Cross of 1914, 1st and 2nd class
 Pour le Mérite (1 December 1914) and Oak Leaves (11 December 1916)
 Order of the Crown, 2nd class with Swords on rings
 Knight's Cross, First Class of the Order of the Zähringer Lion with oak leaves (Baden)
 Order of the Red Eagle, 2nd class with Oak Leaves and Swords on rings
 Knight's Cross Second Class Order of the White Falcon
 Commander of the Order of Orange-Nassau (Netherlands)
 Commander of the Order of St. Michael (Bavaria)
 Knight's Cross, First Class of the Ducal Saxe-Ernestine House Order (Saxon duchies)
 Service Award (Prussia)
 Grand Commander of the Order of the Griffon (Mecklenburg)
 Cross of Merit, First Class of the Lippe House Order with Swords
 Commander Second Class of the Order of the Crown (Württemberg)
 Knight's Cross, First Class of the Friedrich Order (Württemberg)
 Grand Officer of the Order of Military Merit (Bulgaria)
 Order of the Double Dragon, 3rd Degree, First Class
 Commander of the Order of the Crown (Romania)
 Officer of the Order of the White Eagle (Serbia)
 Gold Imtiaz Medal (Ottoman Empire)
 Order of Osmanieh, 2nd class (Ottoman Empire)
 Order of the Medjidie, 2nd class (Ottoman Empire)
 Hanseatic Cross of Lübeck (2 November 1915) [9]
 Gold Liakat Medal (Ottoman Empire)

References

 Hanns Möller: Geschichte der Ritter des Ordens pour le mérite im Weltkrieg, Band II: M–Z, Verlag Bernard & Graefe, Berlin 1935
 Florian Hoffmann: Okkupation und Militärverwaltung in Kamerun. Etablierung und Institutionalisierung des kolonialen Gewaltmonopols 1891–1914, Göttingen 2007
+ Rangliste der Königlich Preußischen Armee und des XIII. (Königlich Württembergischen) Armeekorps für 1914, Hrsg.: Kriegsministerium, Ernst Siegfried Mittler & Sohn, Berlin 1914, S.82
 Lübecker General-Anzeiger, Obituary in the Newspaper from Lübeck of 16th, 21 and 22 February 1928
« Reisen im Hinterlande von Kamerun 1889/91 » in Verhandlungen der Gesellschaft für Erdkunde zu Berlin 1891, cahier 7.
Durch Kamerun von Süd nach Nord. Reisen und Forschungen im Hinterlande 1889 bis 1891, F. A. Brockhaus, 1893, 451 p. [lire en ligne [archive]].
À travers le Cameroun du Sud au Nord : voyages et explorations dans l'arrière pays de 1889 à 1891 (traduction, présentation, commentaire et bibliographie de Philippe Laburthe-Tolra), Université Fédérale du Cameroun, Yaoundé, Université de Haute-Bretagne, Rennes, 1971-1974, 2 vol. (XVIII-375 p.-19 p. de pl.), compte-rendu de Thierno Mouctar Bah (Université de Yaoundé), in Revue française d'histoire d'outre-mer, 1984, vol. 71, no 262, p. 106-107, [lire en ligne [archive]]
Kriegs- und Expeditionsführung in Afrika, Berlin, 1893
Zeitskizzen, Berlin, 1919.
Meiner Truppen Heldenkämpfe, Berlin, 1920.
Cet article est partiellement ou en totalité issu de l’article de Wikipédia en allemand intitulé « Kurt von Morgen » (voir la liste des auteurs).
(de) Florian Hoffmann, Okkupation und Militärverwaltung in Kamerun. Etablierung und Institutionalisierung des kolonialen Gewaltmonopols 1891–1914, Göttingen, 2007, 433 p..
(en) « Kurt von Morgen » [archive], sur La machine prussienne (consulté le 19 août 2015).
Notices d'autoritéVoir et modifier les données sur Wikidata : Fichier d’autorité international virtuel • International Standard Name Identifier • Bibliothèque nationale de France (données) • Système universitaire de documentation • Bibliothèque du Congrès • Gemeinsame Normdatei • WorldCat

1858 births
1928 deaths
People from Nysa, Poland
People from the Province of Silesia
German Army generals of World War I
Generals of Infantry (Prussia)
Recipients of the Pour le Mérite (military class)
Recipients of the Iron Cross (1914), 1st class
Commanders of the Order of Orange-Nassau
Grand Officers of the Order of Military Merit (Bulgaria)
Commanders of the Order of the Crown (Romania)
Recipients of the Gold Imtiyaz Medal
Recipients of the Order of the Medjidie, 2nd class
Recipients of the Hanseatic Cross (Lübeck)
Recipients of the Gold Liakat Medal
German colonial people in Kamerun